Du Bois is a village in Washington County, Illinois, United States. The population was 205 at the 2010 census and as of 2018, the population had declined to an estimated 150.

History
Du Bois was originally named Coloma. In 1869, the village was renamed for Jesse K. Du Bois, state auditor of public accounts, 1856-1864. An early variant name was "Bois".

Geography
Du Bois is located at  (38.223545, -89.213414).

Demographics

As of the census of 2000, there were 222 people, 96 households, and 54 families residing in the village. The racial makeup of the village was 97.30% White, 0.45% Native American, 0.45% from other races, and 1.80% from two or more races. Hispanic or Latino of any race were 2.25% of the population.

There were 96 households, out of which 30.2% had children under the age of 18 living with them, 42.7% were married couples living together, 8.3% had a female householder with no husband present, and 43.8% were non-families. 38.5% of all households were made up of individuals, and 22.9% had someone living alone who was 65 years of age or older. The average household size was 2.31 and the average family size was 3.13.

In the village, the population was spread out, with 30.2% under the age of 18, 7.2% from 18 to 24, 31.1% from 25 to 44, 17.6% from 45 to 64, and 14.0% who were 65 years of age or older. The median age was 35 years. For every 100 females, there were 115.5 males. For every 100 females age 18 and over, there were 93.8 males.

The median income for a household in the village was $30,417, and the median income for a family was $32,500. Males had a median income of $28,750 versus $16,250 for females. The per capita income for the village was $12,367. About 17.3% of families and 15.7% of the population were below the poverty line, including 15.7% of those under the age of eighteen and 27.8% of those 65 or over.

References

Villages in Illinois
Villages in Washington County, Illinois